The 2019 Netball Quad Series was the sixth Netball Quad Series of test matches, contested by four of the five highest ranked nations in netball. The series was held in England in January 2019, several months before the 2019 Netball World Cup.

Despite losing to England in the last match of the series, Australia successfully defended their title, eclipsing the English side on goal difference.

Teams

Matches

Round 1

Round 2

Round 3

Standings
<noinclude>

References

External links
  Fixtures for the series – England Netball website
 

2019
2019 in netball
2019 in Australian netball
2019 in New Zealand netball
2019 in English netball
2019 in South African women's sport
International netball competitions hosted by England
Netball Quad Series
2019 sports events in London